Magadi Road is a Namma Metro station on the Purple Line serving the Magadi Road, Bangalore. The station was constructed by Punj Lloyd and was opened to the public on 16 November 2015.

The parking lot at the Magadi Road metro station can accommodate around 200 motorcycles and 50 cars.

Station layout

See also
Bangalore
List of Namma Metro stations
Transport in Karnataka
List of metro systems
List of rapid transit systems in India
Bangalore Metropolitan Transport Corporation

References

External links

 Bangalore Metro Rail Corporation Ltd. (Official site) 
 UrbanRail.Net – descriptions of all metro systems in the world, each with a schematic map showing all stations.

Namma Metro stations
Railway stations in India opened in 2015
2015 establishments in Karnataka